This is a list of listed buildings in South Ayrshire. The list is split out by parish.

 List of listed buildings in Ayr, South Ayrshire
 List of listed buildings in Ballantrae, South Ayrshire
 List of listed buildings in Barr, South Ayrshire
 List of listed buildings in Colmonell, South Ayrshire
 List of listed buildings in Coylton, South Ayrshire
 List of listed buildings in Craigie, South Ayrshire
 List of listed buildings in Dailly, South Ayrshire
 List of listed buildings in Dundonald, South Ayrshire
 List of listed buildings in Girvan, South Ayrshire
 List of listed buildings in Kirkmichael, South Ayrshire
 List of listed buildings in Kirkoswald, South Ayrshire
 List of listed buildings in Maybole, South Ayrshire
 List of listed buildings in Monkton And Prestwick, South Ayrshire
 List of listed buildings in Prestwick, South Ayrshire
 List of listed buildings in Straiton, South Ayrshire
 List of listed buildings in Symington, South Ayrshire
 List of listed buildings in Tarbolton, South Ayrshire
 List of listed buildings in Troon, South Ayrshire

South Ayrshire